Pakefield Lighthouse is a decommissioned 19th century lighthouse which was built near Pakefield a suburb of Lowestoft in Suffolk.
The lighthouse tower has been used for a variety of maritime, civilian and military roles, and is currently used as a Coastwatch lookout post.

Operational history

Pakefield lighthouse 1832-1864
Completed in 1832 to a design by the architect Richard Suter, it was commissioned by Trinity House to enable a safe passage to be made through Pakefield Gatway (a channel between two shifting sandbanks providing a way into Lowestoft harbour).

 
The light was powered by two argand lamps; it originally consisted of a constant white light that could be seen for nine nautical miles. In 1835 the colour was changed to red, as some ships had confused the light with those shining from the windows of clifftop houses in nearby Kessingland.

Kessingland light 1864-1886
By the time that land negotiations regarding the lighthouse and access road had been completed in 1850, the channel had moved to the south. The lighthouse continued in use (with charts showing an increased angle of approach through the Gatway) until 1864 when Pakefield lighthouse was decommissioned and a new red sector light was established at Kessingland, to the south.

Pakefield light 1886-1906
In 1886, the sandbanks again having shifted, the sector light was moved back to Pakefield, but this time to a location north of the old lighthouse (which remained disused). The following year the angle of the light was altered, the sands again having shifted. In 1905 it was reported that 'considerable alterations have taken place in the depths in Pakefield Gat', shoaling having significantly reduced the depth of water in the former channel. On 1 January 1907 the sector light at Pakefield was discontinued.

Later history
Following its closure in 1864, Pakefield lighthouse remained abandoned for a number of decades until it was subsequently sold to the owners of the Hall in the 1920s, the grounds of which were being used as a campsite; it would eventually become a Pontins holiday camp.

In 1938, prior to the Second World War, the tower became an observation post for the Royal Observer Corps, who were checking for any possible seaborne or air invasion force, with both the roof and lantern being removed to improve visibility.

The tower continued to be used throughout the war, with Auxiliary Territorial Service personnel being stationed at the site. The surrounding holiday campsite was requisitioned and became a transit camp.
It was strafed by the Luftwaffe during an air-raid on Lowestoft in 1943, and in the following year a V-1 doodlebug with a defective gyrocompass was spotted travelling towards the lighthouse, until it crashed into the sea at the base of the cliffs nearby.

After the war, the tower was eventually purchased by Pontins, and in the 1960s it was used by the camp's official photographers as a dark room.

Current use
The lighthouse tower was renovated in 2000, by voluntary workers from the local Pakefield Coastwatch group, and it is now used by the group as a coastal reconnaissance station.

See also

 List of lighthouses in England

References

External links
  Pakefield Coastwatch website

Lighthouses in Suffolk
Lowestoft
Lighthouses completed in 1832